The South African Railways Class H , introduced in 1899, was a steam locomotive from the pre-Union era in the Colony of Natal.

Between 1899 and 1903, the Natal Government Railways placed 101 tank steam locomotives with a  wheel arrangement in service. In 1912, after the establishment of the South African Railways, 93 of these Class C Reid Tenwheelers survived unmodified and were designated .

Design
By 1898, increasing traffic on the new Natal Government Railways (NGR) mainline into the interior, with its sharp curves and severe 1 in 30 (3⅓%) gradients, necessitated double-heading of the NGR's Dübs A  locomotives on the heavier section of the Natal mainline between Estcourt and Mooirivier as a means to run longer trains to reduce occupation of the line. The requirement therefore arose for a tank locomotive which could haul at least one-and-a-half times as much as a  locomotive.

The limitations within which G.W. Reid, Locomotive Superintendent of the NGR at the time, had to meet this requirement were rather severe. The result was Reid's design of a  tank engine, the first locomotive in the world to use this wheel arrangement.

Manufacturers
Since there was no precedent for such an enormous Cape gauge tank locomotive, the design was the subject of some severe criticism and various objections were put forward against its introduction. It was therefore decided to order only one experimental locomotive from Dübs and Company. It was delivered in 1899 and numbered 149.

As a result, orders were placed for another 100 of these locomo­tives between 1901 and 1903. The first 95 of these locomotives were built in four batches by Dübs and were numbered in the range from 150 to 244.

Since Dübs and a number of other Scottish locomotive builders were merged to form the North British Locomotive Company (NBL) while the locomotives were being built, the last five engines were delivered as having been built by the newly established NBL, numbered in the range from 245 to 249.

Classification
On the NGR, the locomotive type became known as the Reid Tenwheeler. When a locomotive classification system was introduced on the NGR, they were designated Class C.

Characteristics
To negotiate sharp curves, both the first and fifth pairs of coupled wheels were flangeless. The cylinders were arranged outside the plate frame, while the Richardson balanced type slide valves were placed between the frames. The locomotive used saturated steam and was equipped with Allan straight link valve gear, which was reversed by hand-wheel and quick screw gear. Allan valve gear was chosen chiefly because it required less space than the more usual Stephenson lifting link gear and was simpler in construction. The trailing Bissel truck was of the Cartazzi type which allowed the axle some lateral movement.

The leading bogie was controlled by two side-check springs and had  of side-play in each direction. This arrangement was later modified on some locomotives by substituting it with swing links. The portion of the driving crankpins for the connecting rod big-ends was turned  eccentric to that of the coupling rods to obtain the longest possible piston stroke which the wheel diameter would permit, while keeping the throw of the coupling rod to a reasonable amount. Since the piston rod and crosshead was forged in one piece, the connecting rod small-end had to be forked.

Modifications
The main shortcoming of the Reid Tenwheeler was a tendency to derail while reversing, particularly over points, since the trailing coupled wheels were flangeless and tended to drop off the rails in the 1 in 7 turnouts which were in use at the time.

When some were withdrawn from mainline service and placed in branch line and shunting service where smaller radius curves were encountered, they were modified to  locomotives by removing the fifth pair of coupled wheels.

South African Railways
When the Union of South Africa was established on 31 May 1910, the three Colonial government railways (Cape Government Railways, NGR and Central South African Railways) were united under a single administration to control and administer the railways, ports and harbours of the Union. Although the South African Railways and Harbours came into existence in 1910, the actual classification and renumbering of all the rolling stock of the three constituent railways were only implemented with effect from 1 January 1912.

In 1912, the 93 as yet unmodified Class C Reid Tenwheelers were designated  on the South African Railways (SAR) and renumbered in the range from 232 to 324. The modified  engines, also designated NGR Class C, were designated Class H2 on the SAR and renumbered in the range from 227 to 231. Three locomotives, NGR numbers 194, 195 and 214, had been scrapped prior to 1912 and did not come under the renumbering scheme.

The SAR Class H locomotives were gradually also modified to a  wheel arrangement. The first three of these, SAR numbers 240, 294 and 305, were renumbered again to 329, 330 and 331 respectively, but the rest retained their Class H engine numbers after modification. Their builders, works numbers and renumbering are listed in the table.

Service
The Reid Tenwheelers were initially employed on the lower section of the Natal mainline and worked both passenger and goods trains. Most of them continued to work there even after more powerful locomotives were placed in service. When the Corridor Train was introduced between Durban and Johannesburg in 1903, the Reid Tenwheelers worked the trains between Durban and Volksrust, but their limited coal and water capacity necessitated en route engine changes at Inchanga, Pietermaritzburg, Mooirivier, Ladysmith and Hattingspruit.

In the SAR era, some were relocated to De Doorns in the Cape Province for banking service up the Hex River Railpass. They had a long service life and some, modified to the  Mountain type, remained in service until 1977.

Other operators

Imperial Military Railways
In 1902 during the Second Boer War, the Imperial Military Railways (IMR) placed orders with Dübs and Company and Neilson, Reid and Company for altogether 35 locomotives of the Reid Tenwheeler type. In SAR service, these locomotives were designated  in 1912.

Industry
A final order for one new Reid Tenwheeler locomotive was placed by Witbank Collieries as late as 1927. The 137 locomotives built to this design was about double the number of all other  locomotives in use elsewhere in the world, all of which were tender locomotives which served mainly in the United States of America and Brazil.

Illustration

References

1130
1130
4-10-2T locomotives
2E1 locomotives
Dübs locomotives
NBL locomotives
Cape gauge railway locomotives
Railway locomotives introduced in 1899
1899 in South Africa
Scrapped locomotives